Damiano Brigo (born Venice, Italy 1966) is an applied mathematician and Chair in Mathematical Finance at Imperial College London. He is known for research in  filtering theory and mathematical finance.

Main results

Brigo started his work with the development,  with Bernard Hanzon and Francois Le Gland (1998), of the projection filters, a family  of approximate nonlinear filters based on the differential geometry approach to statistics, also related to information geometry. With Fabio Mercurio (2002–2003), he has shown how to construct stochastic differential equations consistent with mixture models, applying this to volatility smile modeling in the context of local volatility models. With Aurelien Alfonsi (2005), Brigo introduced new families of multivariate distributions in statistics through the periodic copula function concept. Since 2002, Brigo contributed  to credit derivatives modeling and counterparty risk valuation, showing with Pallavicini and Torresetti (2007) how data implied non-negligible probability that several names defaulted together, showing some large default clusters and a concrete risk of high losses in collateralized debt obligations prior to the financial crisis of 2007–2008. This work has been further updated in 2010 leading to a volume for Wiley, while a volume on the updated nonlinear theory of valuation, including credit effects, collateral modeling and funding costs, has appeared in 2013. Overall Brigo authored more than seventy publications and co-authored the book Interest rate models: theory and practice for Springer-Verlag, that quickly became an international reference for stochastic dynamic interest rate modeling in finance. Brigo has been the most cited author in the technical section of the industry influential Risk Magazine in 2006, 2010 and 2012.

Current and past affiliations
Brigo was appointed Chair in Mathematical Finance at the Department of Mathematics of Imperial College London in 2012. He is also Director of the Capco Institute. He previously held the Gilbart Chair of Financial Mathematics at King's College London (2010-2012) and worked as Managing Director at Fitch Solutions in London (2007-2010). 
He holds  a PhD in Stochastic Nonlinear Filtering with Differential Geometric Method from the Free University of Amsterdam.

Selected publications
Brigo, D, Morini, M., and Pallavicini, A, Counterparty Credit Risk, Collateral and Funding, with Pricing Cases for All Asset Classes. Wiley, 2013.
Brigo, D, Pallavicini, A, and Torresetti, R, Credit Models and the Crisis: A Journey into CDOs, Copulas, Correlations and Dynamic Models. Wiley, 2010.
Brigo, D, Mercurio, F, Interest Rate Models: Theory and Practice - with Smile, Inflation and Credit, Heidelberg, Springer Verlag, 2001, 2nd Edition 2006.
Brigo, D, Hanzon, B, LeGland, F, A differential geometric approach to nonlinear filtering: The projection filter, IEEE T AUTOMAT CONTR, 1998, Vol: 43, Pages: 247 - 252, 
Brigo, D, Hanzon, B, Le Gland, F, Approximate nonlinear filtering by projection on exponential manifolds of densities, BERNOULLI, 1999, Vol: 5, Pages: 495 - 534, 
Brigo, D, On SDEs with marginal laws evolving in finite-dimensional exponential families, STAT PROBABIL LETT, 2000, Vol: 49, Pages: 127 - 134, 
Brigo, D, Diffusion Processes, Manifolds of Exponential Densities, and Nonlinear Filtering, In: Ole E. Barndorff-Nielsen and Eva B. Vedel Jensen, editor, Geometry in Present Day Science, World Scientific, 1999
Brigo, D, Mercurio, F, Lognormal-mixture dynamics and calibration to market volatility smiles, International Journal of Theoretical and Applied Finance, 2002, Vol: 5, Pages: 427 - 446
Brigo, D, Mercurio, F, Sartorelli, G, Alternative asset-price dynamics and volatility smile, QUANT FINANC, 2003, Vol: 3, Pages: 173 - 183, 
Alfonsi, A, Brigo, D, New families of copulas based on periodic functions, COMMUN STAT-THEOR M, 2005, Vol: 34, Pages: 1437 - 1447, 
Brigo, D, Alfonsi, A, Credit default swap calibration and derivatives pricing with the SSRD stochastic intensity model, FINANC STOCH, 2005, Vol: 9, Pages: 29 - 42, 
Brigo, D (2008), CDS Options through Candidate Market Models and the CDS-Calibrated CIR++ Stochastic Intensity Model, In: Wagner, N., editor, Credit Risk: Models, Derivatives and Management, Taylor & Francis, 2008
Brigo, D, Pallavicini, A, Torresetti, R, (2007) Cluster-based extension of the generalized poisson loss dynamics andconsistency with single names, International Journal of Theoretical and Applied Finance, Vol: 10
Brigo, D., Pallavicini, A. (2007). Counterparty Risk under Correlation between Default and Interest Rates. In: Miller, J., Edelman, D., and Appleby, J. (Editors), Numerical Methods for Finance, Chapman Hall.

References

External links
 Damiano Brigo's web page at Imperial College London
 Damiano Brigo at Defaultrisk.com
 Damiano Brigo as Director of the Capco Institute

21st-century Italian mathematicians
Financial economists
Control theorists
Probability theorists
Living people
Academics of King's College London
Academic staff of Bocconi University
Academics of Imperial College London
Place of birth missing (living people)
1966 births
Vrije Universiteit Amsterdam alumni
20th-century Italian mathematicians